Q83 may refer to:
 Q83 (New York City bus)
 Al-Mutaffifin, a surah of the Quran